The 1960 BYU Cougars football team represented Brigham Young University (BYU) as a member of the Skyline Conference during the 1960 NCAA University Division football season. In their second and final season under head coach Tally Stevens, the Cougars compiled an overall record of 3–8 record with a mark of 2–5 against conference opponents, tied for fifth place in the Skyline, and were outscored by all opponents by a combined total of 207 to 102.

The team's statistical leaders included Bud Belnap with 285 passing yards and Jack Gifford with 254 rushing yards, 138 receiving yards, and 18 points scored.

Schedule

References

BYU
BYU Cougars football seasons
BYU Cougars football